The Puji Bridge, commonly known as Shengtang Bridge, is a historic stone arch bridge in the town of Jinze, Qingpu District, Shanghai.

Name
The bridge is named after Shengtang Temple, a Buddhist temple nearby the bridge.

History
The bridge was originally built in 1267, in the 3rd year of Xianchun period (1265–1274) of the Southern Song dynasty (1127–1279). It was renovated in the Ming and Qing dynasties (1368–1911). In 1987 it was inscribed to the fourth batch of  Municipal Level Cultural Heritage List by the Shanghai Municipal Government.

Architecture
It is made of a very precious purple stone, namely the fluorite. Washed by rain, it appears shiny purple under the sun, sparkling and colorful.

References

Bibliography

External links
 Puji Bridge in Jinze, Qingpu District of Shanghai Bridges in China 

Bridges in Shanghai
Arch bridges in China
Bridges completed in the 13th century
Song dynasty architecture
Buildings and structures completed in 1267
13th-century establishments in China